Fabiano Aguiar Dionizio Laurentino (born 22 September 1982), known as Fabinho Recife, is a Brazilian footballer who plays as forward for São Domingos Futebol Clube.

Biography
He was signed by PFC Cherno More Varna from Vera Cruz (PE) on 11 July 2007. However, he left for C.D. Pinhalnovense along with Djalma in January 2008.

In December 2008 he returned to Brazil and returned to his journeyman career in state competitions. Recently he played for Guarany de Sobral in 2011 Campeonato Cearense, however he was released prior the start of 2011 Campeonato Brasileiro Série C.

In January 2012 he was signed by CSE but in March left for São Domingos. He played for the club in 2012 Campeonato Sergipe (scored a goal in semi-final) and 2012 Copa do Brasil.

References

Brazilian footballers
First Professional Football League (Bulgaria) players
PFC Cherno More Varna players
Brazilian expatriate footballers
Expatriate footballers in Bulgaria
Brazilian expatriate sportspeople in Bulgaria
Sportspeople from Pernambuco
1982 births
Living people
C.D. Pinhalnovense players
Association football forwards